Kushk (also Romanized as Kūshk) is a village in Meshkan Rural District, Meshkan District, Khoshab County, Razavi Khorasan Province, Iran. At the 2006 census, its population was 74, in 22 families.

References 

Populated places in Khoshab County